Chameleon Boy (Reep Daggle), also known as Chameleon, is a superhero appearing in American comic books published by DC Comics, primarily as a member of the Legion of Super-Heroes in the 30th and 31st centuries.

Publication history
Chameleon Boy first appeared in Action Comics #267 (August 1960) and was created by Jerry Siegel and Jim Mooney.

Fictional character biography
Reep Daggle is from the planet Durla, whose inhabitants are shapeshifters to adapt to an environment destroyed by a thermonuclear war. He has orange skin, pointed ears and antennae, and has no hair in his usual humanoid form. In pre-Zero Hour continuity, he was the son of Legion financer R. J. Brande, a Durlan who had become frozen in human form after contracting a disease and a female Durlan named Zhay. Reep did not learn that Brande was his father for many years; he and his twin sibling Liggt were raised by their maternal aunt Ji. As Durlans were viewed with suspicion by natives of Earth, Reep applied for membership in the Legion to set a positive example to counter that prejudice and found that the Legion agreed with his aims on top of his talents to induct him. Thanks in part to his exceptional deductive skills he is named the permanent head of the Legion's Espionage Squad.

Chameleon Boy was sentenced to incarceration on the prison world Takron-Galtos for his espionage activities against the Khunds, and was released after his heroics in the Great Darkness Saga.

Zero Hour reboot
Post-Zero Hour, Reep was known simply as 'Chameleon' and was not related to R. J. Brande. This time, he was the son of Durla's spiritual leader and heir to that title, though he long refused to accept it, believing he served his people better as part of the Legion.

2005 "Threeboot"
In the 2005 reboot of the Legion, the character was still referred to as Chameleon, but is now an androgynous humanoid. Chameleon can still shapeshift and is still a master detective. A minor difference to prior versions of the character is that his default form does not usually have visible antennae, although he produces them to analyze unfamiliar objects.

Post-Infinite Crisis
In the Infinite Crisis Chameleon Boy is included in the Legion, but is considered "missing"; Superman #696 shows that Chameleon Boy has been posing as Control, a young woman who assists in running the Science Police in the 21st Century. As revealed in Adventure Comics vol. 2 #8, Chameleon Boy is part of a secret team sent to the 21st century by the late RJ Brande to save the future in the Last Stand of New Krypton storyline.

In the "Watchmen" sequel "Doomsday Clock", Chameleon Boy is among the Legion of Super-Heroes members that appear in the present after Doctor Manhattan undid the experiment that erased the Legion of Super-Heroes and the Justice Society of America.

Powers and abilities
Chameleon Boy has the same shape-shifting ability that is innate among all his people. They can take the form of any object or organism their body can 'scan' with their antennae and morph into it within seconds. Reep is able to shift into forms both larger and smaller than he is, creating or disregarding mass at whim. He can also elongate parts of his body with this excess mass creation, as well as rearrange his internal organs and tissue such as his eyes, nose, heart, etc. He is a skilled voice imitator to go along with his disguises. Because of these feats he is considered one of the most powerful and versatile Durlan shape-shifters.

Equipment
As a member of the Legion of Super-Heroes he is provided a Legion Flight Ring. It allows him to fly and protects him from the vacuum of space and other dangerous environments.

In other media

Television

 Reep Daggle as Chameleon Boy appears in the Superman: The Animated Series episode "New Kids in Town", voiced by Jason Priestley.
 Reep Daggle as Chameleon Boy makes a non-speaking appearance in the Justice League Unlimited episode "Far From Home".
 Reep Daggle as Chameleon Boy appears in Legion of Super Heroes, voiced by Alexander Polinsky. This version is younger, primarily turns into animals, and is generally humorous and wise-cracking, though he can be serious if necessary and is prepared to break Legion rules if he thinks they are unjust.
 Reep Daggle as Chameleon Boy appears in Young Justice, voiced by Dee Bradley Baker. This version sports a reptilian appearance.

Miscellaneous
Reep Daggle as Chameleon Boy appears in Smallville Season 11.

Cultural impact
As a boy, comic writer Peter Hogan liked the design aesthetic of Chameleon Boy. When he and artist Steve Parkhouse were creating Resident Alien, Hogan specifically requested Parkhouse base the main character's appearance on the DC hero.

References

External links
A Hero History Of Chameleon Boy

DC Comics aliens
DC Comics extraterrestrial superheroes
DC Comics superheroes
DC Comics characters who are shapeshifters
Fictional detectives
Comics characters introduced in 1960
Characters created by Jerry Siegel
Characters created by Jim Mooney
Fictional characters who can stretch themselves
Fictional twins